Silent Trigger is a 1996 American action thriller film directed by Russell Mulcahy starring Dolph Lundgren and Gina Bellman about a sniper and his female spotter. Lundgren plays Waxman, a former Special Forces soldier who is now working as a heavily armed assassin sent on a mission by a secretive "Agency", to assassinate a target from an abandoned skyscraper in construction. Memories and moral dilemmas resurface when a former spotter from a failed assignment shows up.

Plot 

The movie takes place in and around an unfinished city skyscraper, the "Algonquin", where a sniper/spotter team (Waxman and Clegg) set up a firing platform on a top floor. The two arrive independently of each other, two of the Agency's assassins. As they meet, they recognize each other, as they have been on a mission together before.

This mission is portrayed in a series of flashbacks. In the first flashback, Waxman and Clegg were supposed to assassinate a female politician. Waxman hesitates when the politician lifts a child and, while hesitating, a helicopter appears, air assaulting soldiers in the courtyard behind the team's firing position. The two defeat the attacking force, including the machine gun-equipped helicopter, whose pilot and copilot are shot through the canopy.

Returning to the primary scene, one of the construction site security personnel is new on the job. The drug-addicted regular, O'Hara (Christopher Heyerdahl) attempts to win a statutory position over him by scaring him. As Waxman opens a roof door, a light by the security personnel turns on, and the newcomer, Klein (Conrad Dunn) leaves in search of it.

The internal lift of the building is clearly audible, and Clegg surveys Klein's movements, when he arrives. She interrupts his inspections when he is about to open the roof door. She takes him to the lift, sending him downwards. However, just as she is talking him off, she sees Waxman sitting on top of the lift car. He mounts a bomb on the lift car and, when the car begins moving, nearly falls down the shaft. He is saved by Clegg, and they both attempt keeping up the "just business"-facade, although some romantic appreciation is apparent.

While the two on the rooftop readjust their gear, O'Hara, presumably, decides to rape Clegg. However, Clegg pulls her small-caliber sidearm, and threatens O'Hara into the lift. When O'Hara returns downstairs, he picks up his gun and puts on body armor. He then surprises Clegg, while she is standing over the sink of the top-floor bathrooms. Clegg points her gun at him, and shoots a well-aimed bullet into his chest. Unsurprised by this, O'Hara attacks Clegg, but is encountered by Waxman, and a violent fight takes place in an unfinished hall between various building materials. The fight is won by Waxman, and he ties the now bloody O'Hara to a toilet.

Clegg and Waxman consummate their feelings for each other. Afterwards, as duty continues, Waxman heads for the bathrooms, but sees water running out under the door to the bathroom. He pulls his gun, and discovers that O'Hara has disappeared.

O'Hara bears the toilet with him down the stairs. A vengeful O'Hara grabs his shotgun and is about to go upstairs to finish off Waxman. Klein, the new security guard, shoots O'Hara with his shotgun, walks to the spot where the dying O'Hara lies and, in cold blood, puts a final shot into him.

Upstairs, the two are engaging the target. As before, Waxman hesitates and does not take the shot. As history repeats itself for the two, Clegg pulls her sidearm and implores Waxman to do his duty. Before the situation escalates, another shooter shoots the target four times and, when finished, takes aim for Clegg and Waxman. Waxman quickly throws himself and Clegg away from the shot, grabs his rifle and shoots the adversary. Waxman and Clegg defend themselves from Special Forces personnel raiding the skyscraper. Waxman and Clegg are surprised by Klein, who has stealthily entered the room. He shoots Waxman in the chest with his shotgun, but is threatened by Clegg who has picked up an MP5 submachine gun. He takes the lift car and leaves when the planted bomb explodes.

Believing Waxman to be dead, Clegg flees the skyscraper. As she walks away from the building, the top of a nearby fire hydrant is shot off. She looks up and sees Waxman, removing/revealing the body armor that he was wearing, then throwing his sniper rifle from the building. He then quietly mouths "Goodbye" to her.  Clegg mouths "Bye", then walks away, smiling, as the skyscraper continues to burn.

Cast
 Dolph Lundgren as Waxman "Shooter"
 Gina Bellman as Clegg "Spotter"
 Conrad Dunn as Klein "Supervisor"
 Christopher Heyerdahl as O'Hara

See also 
 List of American films of 1996

External links 
 
 
 

1996 films
Italian action thriller films
Canadian action thriller films
American action thriller films
British thriller films
1990s English-language films
1996 action thriller films
Films directed by Russell Mulcahy
Films scored by Stefano Mainetti
Films about snipers
1990s American films
1990s Canadian films
1990s British films